The 2020 Manmohan Memorial National One-Day Cricket Tournament was the second edition of one of the main domestic 50-over competitions in Nepal, alongside the Prime Minister One Day Cup. The tournament featured sides representing the seven provinces of Nepal plus three departments, the host club (MMCC Inaruwa) and a Malaysian XI. This was the second edition of the tournament after the first was held in January 2019. The Malaysian national side played a series of one-day matches against Nepal after the conclusion of the tournament.

The Nepal Army Club won the first semi-final, beating Province Number 3 by 64 runs. The second semi-final saw Nepal Police Club triumph by 99 runs against Sudur Paschim Province. The Army Club went on to retain the title with an 85-run victory in the final.

Group A

Points table

Fixtures

Group B

Points table

Fixtures

Group C

Points table

Fixtures

Group D

Points table

Fixtures

Semi-finals

Final

References

External links
 Series home at ESPN Cricinfo

Manmohan Memorial National One-Day Cricket Tournament
Manmohan Memorial National One-Day Cricket Tournament
2019-20